The Netherlands national racquetball team represents the Nederlandse Racquetball Associatie in racquetball international competitions. Is a member of the European Racquetball Federation and International Racquetball Federation. The Netherlands has won the European Championships 3 times in overall's competition, 2 times in men's and 1 in women's competition.

History

Players
National team in the European Championships 2009

References

External links
 Nederlandse Racquetball Associatie Netherlands Racquetball Association

National racquetball teams
Racquetball
Racquetball in the Netherlands